A chimera or chimeric virus is a virus that contains genetic material derived from two or more distinct viruses. It is defined by the Center for Veterinary Biologics (part of the U.S. Department of Agriculture's Animal and Plant Health Inspection Service) as a "new hybrid microorganism created by joining nucleic acid fragments from two or more different microorganisms in which each of at least two of the fragments contain essential genes necessary for replication." The term genetic chimera had already been defined to mean: an individual organism whose body contained cell populations from different zygotes or an organism that developed from portions of different embryos. Chimeric flaviviruses have been created in an attempt to make novel live attenuated vaccines.

Etymology 
In mythology, a chimera is a creature such as a hippogriff or a gryphon formed from parts of different animals, thus the name for these viruses.

As a natural phenomenon
Viruses are categorized in two types: In prokaryotes, the great majority of viruses possess double-stranded (ds) DNA genomes, with a substantial minority of single-stranded (ss) DNA viruses and only limited presence of RNA viruses. In contrast, in eukaryotes, RNA viruses account for the majority of the virome diversity although ssDNA and dsDNA viruses are common as well.

In 2012, the first example of a naturally-occurring RNA-DNA hybrid virus was unexpectedly discovered during a metagenomic study of the acidic extreme environment of Boiling Springs Lake that is in Lassen Volcanic National Park, California. The virus was named BSL-RDHV (Boiling Springs Lake RNA DNA Hybrid Virus).<ref name=devor12>Devor, Caitlin (12 July 2012)."Scientists discover hybrid virus". Journal of Young Investigators". Retrieved 31 March 2020.</ref> Its genome is related  to a DNA circovirus, which usually infect birds and pigs, and a RNA tombusvirus, which infect plants. The study surprised scientists, because DNA and RNA viruses vary and the way the chimera came together was not understood.BioMed Central Limited (18 April 2012). "Could a newly discovered viral genome change what we thought we knew about virus evolution?". ScienceDaily. Retrieved March 31, 2020.

Other viral chimeras have also been found, and the group is known as the CHIV viruses ("chimeric viruses").

 As a bioweapon 
Combining two pathogenic viruses increases the lethality of the new virus which is why there have been cases where chimeric viruses have been considered for use as a bioweapon. For example, the Soviet Union's Chimera Project attempted in the late 1980s and early 1990s to combine DNA from Venezuelan equine encephalitis virus and Smallpox virus at one location, and Ebola virus and Smallpox virus in another location, even in the face of Boris Yeltsin's decree of 11 April 1992.

A combination Smallpox virus and Monkeypox virus'' has also been studied.

As a medical treatment 
Studies have shown that chimeric viruses can also be developed to have medical benefits. The US Food and Drug Administration (FDA) has recently approved the use of chimeric antigen receptor (CAR) to treat relapsed non-Hodgkin Lymphoma. By introducing a chimeric antigen receptor into T cells, the T cells become more efficient at identifying and attacking the tumor cells. Studies are also in progress to create a chimeric vaccine against four types of Dengue virus, however this has not been successful yet.

References

Viruses
Chimerism
Hybrid organisms